Yasuo Tanaka may refer to:

, Japanese novelist and politician
, Japanese astronomer
, Japanese voice actor
, Japanese swimmer